Boris Ivanovich Cheranovsky (alternatively romanized as Chyeranovskii; 1  (13) July 1896 – 17 December 1960) was a Soviet aircraft designer, notable for creating aircraft with a characteristic tailless parabolic wing. — the BICh-1 and BICh-2 gliders from 1924, and the powered BICh-3 later.

B. I. Cheranovsky was born on either 1 or 13 July 1896 in Pavlovychi, Volhynian Governorate, Russia.  By profession he was painter and sculptor, but in 1920 became interested in aviation. In 1921, for the first time, he proposed a project of a "flying wing" type of aircraft. Colleagues of the aircraft designer did not believe in the possibility of implementing the idea. In two years, the specialist managed to complete the relevant works and presented prototypes of the technology. Tests at the airfield began on April 1, 1923. It was then that BICh-1 was tested. From 1924 to 1927 he studied at the Air Force Academy. From 1922 on he engaged in the design and construction of airframes and aircraft of the flying wing configuration.  For his services to the aviation industry, Cheranovsky was awarded the Order of the Red Star.  He died in Moscow, Soviet Union, on 17 December 1960.

See also 
:Category:Chyeranovskii aircraft

References 

1896 births
1960 deaths
Soviet engineers
Aircraft designers